The 1360s was a decade of the Julian Calendar which began on January 1, 1360, and ended on December 31, 1369.

Significant people

References